The 1999 America East men's basketball tournament was hosted by the Delaware Blue Hens at Bob Carpenter Center . The final was also held at Bob Carpenter Center. Delaware gained its second consecutive America East Conference Championships and an automatic berth to the NCAA tournament with its win over Drexel. Delaware was given the 13th seed in the East Regional of the NCAA Tournament and lost in the first round to Tennessee 62–52. Hofstra University gained a bid to the NIT and lost in the first round to Rutgers 58–45.

Bracket and Results

See also
America East Conference

References

America East Conference men's basketball tournament
1998–99 America East Conference men's basketball season
America East Men's Basketball
College basketball tournaments in Delaware
Newark, Delaware